Harefield Academy is a secondary school and sixth form in Uxbridge, London. Located on the site of the former community school, John Penrose School, which closed on 31 August 2005, it reopened as an academy in 2005 and specialises in sports. Among other connections, Watford Football Club provides coaching there (the school serves as its youth system), and it also hosts an elite gymnastics division.

In January 2014, the academy was one of three schools that featured in BBC Three's six-part series Tough Young Teachers. The series was filmed throughout the 2012–2013 academic year.

Notable alumni
Jazzi Barnum-Bobb, footballer 
Gavin Massey, footballer 
Sean Murray, footballer
Jadon Sancho, footballer

Sources

Official Website
Watford Football Club
Gymnastics body
Department for Children, Schools and Families case study

Academies in the London Borough of Hillingdon
Secondary schools in the London Borough of Hillingdon
Educational institutions established in 2005
2005 establishments in England